Founded in 1957, the International Conference of Sports Car Clubs (ICSCC) is the largest sports car racing sanctioning body in the Pacific Northwest of the United States.

The organization provides regulatory and administrative support, including guidelines for the administration and rules for competition in organized sports car racing throughout its membership area.

Each member club holds one or more racing events each year. The events are run under the umbrella rules provided by ICSCC, with the member clubs providing services at their home track.

Cars may qualify for one or more of the fifty classes defined by the organization. Drivers involved in the ICSCC compete in more than ten races each year throughout the Pacific Northwest, earning points which count towards a championship in class. With this structure, drivers earn a truly regional championship.

Member clubs and home tracks
 Cascade Sports Car Club – Portland International Raceway
 International Race Drivers' Club – Pacific Raceways, The Ridge Motorsports Park
 Northwest Motor Sports – Spokane Raceway Park
 Sports Car Club of B.C. – Mission Raceway Park
 Team Continental – Oregon Raceway Park

Affiliate clubs
 BMW Car Club of America Puget Sound Region
 Central Racing Association
 Victoria Motor Sports Club
 Vancouver Sports Car Club

External links 
 ICSCC Official Website

Auto racing organizations in the United States